Qeshlaq-e Luleh Darreh Hajj Meyn Bashi-ye Sofla (also Romanized as Qeshlāq-e Lūleh Darreh Ḩājj Meyn Bāshī-ye Soflá) is a village in Abish Ahmad Rural District, Abish Ahmad District, Kaleybar County, East Azerbaijan Province, Iran. At the 2006 census, its population was 33, in 5 families.

References 

Populated places in Kaleybar County